Absala is a monotypic moth genus in the family Geometridae. It consists of only one species, Absala dorcada, which is found in China, India, Thailand and Vietnam. Both the genus and species were first described by Charles Swinhoe in 1893.

References

Pseudoterpnini
Geometridae genera
Monotypic moth genera
Moths of Asia
Moths described in 1893